This is a list of notable Seychellois musicians.

To be included in this list, the person must have a Wikipedia article.

Musicians

A–J
Angie Arnephy – singer
Jean-Marc Volcy – composer, songwriter
Dezil' - Band

K–Z
Sandra Esparon – singer and performer

See also

Music of Seychelles

References

 
 
Musicians
Musicians